This is a list of agencies and departments of the Union Government of India.

Ministry of Agriculture
 National Centre for Integrated Pest Management
 National Horticulture Board (NHB)
 National Oilseeds and Vegetable Oils Development Board (NOVOD)
 National Dairy Development Board (NDDB)
 National Agricultural Cooperative Marketing Federation of India (NAFED)
 National Centre for Cold-chain Development (NCCD) - Autonomous agency under PPP mode of functioning.
 Indian Council of Agricultural Research (ICAR)
 Directorate of Marketing & Inspection (DMI)*
 Small Farmers' Agri-business Consortium*
 CCS National Institute of Agricultural Marketing (CCS NIAM)*

Ministry of Panchayati Raj

Ministry of Chemicals and Fertilizers
 Department of Chemicals and Petro-Chemicals
 Hindustan Organic Chemicals Limited
 Indian Potash Limited
 National Fertilizers Limited
 Hindustan Insecticides
 Central Institute of Petrochemical Engineering and Technology (CIPET)
 Department of Pharmaceuticals
 National Pharmaceutical Pricing Authority
 India Chemicals and Pharmaceuticals Limited
 Hindustan Antibiotics
 Karnataka Antibiotics and Pharmaceuticals
 Indian Drugs and Pharmaceuticals
 Rajasthan Drugs and Pharmaceuticals
 National Institute for Pharmaceutical Education and Research

Ministry of Civil Aviation
 Directorate General of Civil Aviation
 Bureau of Civil Aviation Security
 Airports Authority of India
 Airports Economic Regulatory Authority
 Pawan Hans Helicopters Ltd.
 Indira Gandhi Rashtriya Uran Academy
 Commission of Railway Safety

Ministry of Coal
 Coal Controller
 Commissioner of Payments
 Coal India (CIL)
 Neyveli Lignite Corporation (NLC)
 Singareni Collieries Company Limited (SCCL)
 Coal Mines Provident Fund Organisation (CMPFO)

Ministry of Commerce and Industry

Departments
 Department of Commerce
 Department for Promotion of Industry and Internal Trade

Attached Offices
 Directorate General of Foreign Trade (DGFT)
 Directorate General of Trade Remedies (DGTR)
 Directorate General of Supplies and Disposals (DGS&D)
 Office of the Economic Adviser
 Directorate General of Commercial Intelligence and Statistics (DGCI&S)
 Office of the Controller General of Patents, Designs and Trade Marks (CGPDTM)
 Indian Patent Office
 Special Economic Zones
 Petroleum and Explosives Safety Organisation

Statutory Bodies
 Export Inspection Council (EIC)
 Export Inspection Agency-Delhi
 Export Inspection Agency-Kolkata
 Export Inspection Agency-Kochi
 Export Inspection Agency-Mumbai
 Export Inspection Agency-Chennai
 Export Inspection Agency-Kakinada

Autonomous Bodies
 Indian Institute of Foreign Trade (IIFT)
 Agricultural and Processed Food Products Export Development Authority (APEDA)
 Federation of Indian Export Organisations (FIEO)
 Intellectual Property Appellate Board (IPAB)
 National Accreditation Board for Testing and Calibration Laboratories (NABL)
 Quality Council of India (QCI)
 National Institute of Design
  Open Network for Digital Commerce
 Indian Institute of Packaging (IIP)
 Indian Institute of Plantation Management Bengaluru (IIPM B)
 Indian Rubber Manufacturers Research Association (IRMRA)
 Marine Products Export Development Authority (MPEDA)
 Indian Diamond Institute
 National Numbering Organisation (EAN-India)
 National Productivity Council (NPC)

Boards
 Tea Board
 Coffee Board
 Spices Board
 Rubber Board
 Tobacco Board

Commissions
 Tariff Commission

Promotion Councils
 Cashew Export Promotion Council of India (CEPCI)
 Chemical and Allied Products Export Promotion Council (CAPEXIL)
 Basic Chemicals, Pharmaceuticals and Cosmetics Export Promotion Council (CHEMEXCIL)
 The Gem and Jewellery Export Promotion Council (GJEPC)
 Council for Leather Exports
 National Manufacturing Competitiveness Council (NMCC)
 Engineering Export Promotion Council (EEPC)
 Plastics Export Promotion Council (PLEXCONCIL)
 Sports Goods Export Promotion Council (SGEPC)
 Project Exports Promotion Council of India (PEPC)

Public Sector Undertakings
 Export Credit Guarantee Corporation of India (ECGC)
 India Trade Promotion Organisation (ITPO)
 State Trading Corporation of India Limited (STCI)
 Minerals and Metals Trading Corporation of India (MMTC)
 National Centre for Trade Information (NCTI)

Ministry of Communications and Information Technology

Departments and Attached Offices
 Department of Information Technology
 Department of Posts
 Department of Telecommunications
 National Informatics Centre (NIC)
 Standardisation, Testing and Quality Certification (STQC)
 Electronics Regional Test Laboratory (ERTL)
 Unique Identification Authority of India(UIDAI)

Autonomous Bodies
 National Institute of Electronics and Information Technology (NIELIT)
 Centre for Development of Advanced Computing (C-DAC)
 Telecom Regulatory Authority of India (TRAI)
 Centre for Development of Telematics (C-DOT)
 Centre for Materials for Electronics Technology (C-MET)
 Education and Research Network (ERNET)
 Electronics and Computer Software Export Promotion Council (ESC)
 MIT Accreditation of Computer Courses
 Society for Applied Microwave Electronic Engineering and Research (SAMEER)
 Software Technology Parks of India (STPI)
 Media Lab Asia (MLAsia)
 Indian Telephone Industries Limited (Public Sector Undertaking)

Ministry of Consumer Affairs, Food and Public Distribution

Departments

Department of Consumer Affairs
 Bureau of Indian Standards (BIS)
 National Test House
 Consumer Online Resource and Empowerment Centre (CORE)
 National Consumer Disputes Redressal Commission (NCDRC)
 National Co-operative Consumers' Federation of India Limited (NCCF)

Department of Food and Public Distribution
 Food Corporation of India (statutory body)
 Central Warehousing Corporation (statutory body)
 Directorate of Sugar
 National Sugar Institute
 Directorate of Vanaspati, Vegetable Oils and Fats
 Forward Markets Commission

Ministry of Co-operation
 National Cooperative Development Corporation (NCDC) - a Statutory Corporation

Ministry of Corporate Affairs
 Registrar of Companies, India
 National Company Law Tribunal
 Competition Commission of India
 Serious Fraud Investigation Office (SFIO)
 Indian Institute of Corporate Affairs (IICA)

Statutory Bodies
 Institute of Company Secretaries of India
 Institute of Chartered Accountants of India
 Institute of Cost Accountants of India

Ministry of Culture

Offices
 Anthropological Survey of India (AnSI)
 Archaeological Survey of India (ASI)
 Central Reference Library
 National Archives of India (NAI)
 National Library of India
 National Museum, New Delhi
 National Gallery of Modern Art, New Delhi
 National Gallery of Modern Art, Mumbai
 National Gallery of Modern Art, Bengaluru
 National Research Laboratory for Conservation of Cultural Property (NRLC)
 National Mission on Monuments and Antiquities

Autonomous and other bodies
 Asiatic Society
 Central Institute of Higher Tibetan Studies (CIHTS)
 Centre for Cultural Resources and Training (CCRT)
 Gandhi Smriti and Darshan Samiti (GSDS)
 Indian Museum, Kolkata
 Indira Gandhi National Centre for the Arts (IGNCA)
 Kalakshetra Foundation, Chennai
 Khuda Bakhsh Oriental Public Library, Patna
 Maulana Abul Kalam Azad Institute of Asian Studies (MAKAIAS)
 National Council of Science Museums (NCSM)
 National Culture Fund
 National Electronic Register of Jain Manuscripts
 National Mission for Manuscripts
 National Museum Institute (NMI)
 National School of Drama
 Raja Rammohun Roy Library Foundation (RRRLF)
 Rampur Raza Library
 Sahitya Akademi
 Sangeet Natak Akademi
 Lalit Kala Akademi
 Victoria Memorial Hall, Kolkata
 Zonal Cultural Centres:
 Eastern Zonal Cultural Centre
 North Central Zone Cultural Centre
 North East Zone Cultural Centre
 North Zone Cultural Centre
 South Central Zone Cultural Centre
 South Zone Cultural Centre
 West Zone Cultural Centre

Ministry of Defence

Department of Defence Research and Development
 Defence Research and Development Organisation
 Aeronautical Development Agency
 Society for Integrated Circuit Technology and Applied Research

Department of Defence Production
 Ordnance Factory Board
 Directorate General of Quality Assurance (DGQA)
 Directorate General of Aeronautical Quality Assurance (DGAQA)
 Directorate of Standardisation
 Directorate of Planning & Coordination
 Defence Exhibition Organisation (DEO)

Department of Ex-Servicemen Welfare
 Directorate General of Resettlement (DGR)
 Kendriya Sainik Board (KSB)
 Air Force Naval Housing Board (AFNHB)

Finance Division
 Controller General of Defence Accounts (CGDA)

Intelligence Agencies
 Defence Intelligence Agency
 Directorate of Air Intelligence
 Directorate of Military Intelligence
 Directorate of Naval Intelligence

Inter-Service Organisations
 Office of the Chief Administrative Officer
 Directorate General of Defence Estates
 Directorate General of Married Accommodation Project (DG MAP)
 Institute for Defence Studies and Analyses (IDSA)

Ministry of Earth Sciences

Executive Arm 
 Earth System Science Organization(ESSO)

Subordinate Offices 
 India Meteorological Department (IMD)
 National Centre for Medium Range Weather Forecasting (NCMRWF)

Attached Offices 
 National Centre for Coastal Research(NCCR), Chennai
 Centre for Marine Living Resource and Ecology(CMLRE), Kochi
 National Centre for Seismology(NCS), Delhi

Autonomous Offices 
 Indian Institute of Tropical Meteorology (IITM), Pune
 National Institute of Ocean Technology (NIOT), Chennai
 Indian National Centre for Ocean Information Services (INCOIS), Hyderabad
 National Centre for Polar and Ocean Research (NCPOR), Goa
 National Centre for Earth Science Studies(NCESS), Thiruvananthapuram

Ministry of Environment, Forest and Climate Change

Subordinate and statutory bodies
 Andaman & Nicobar Islands Forest and Plantation Development Corporation (Public Sector Undertaking)
 Animal Welfare Board of India
 Botanical Survey of India (BSI), Kolkata
 Central Pollution Control Board
 Central Zoo Authority, New Delhi
 Directorate of Forest Education (DFE), Dehradun
 Forest Survey of India (FSI), Dehradun
 Indira Gandhi National Forest Academy (IGNFA), Dehradun
 National Afforestation and Eco-Development Board
 National Biodiversity Authority, Chennai
 National Ganga River Basin Authority
 National Institute of Animal Welfare
 National Museum of Natural History (NMNH), New Delhi
 National Tiger Conservation Authority
 National Zoological Park (NZP), New Delhi
 Zoological Survey of India (ZSI), Kolkata

Autonomous bodies
 Govind Ballabh Pant Institute of Himalayan Environment and Development, Almora
 Indian Council of Forestry Research and Education (ICFRE), Dehradun
 Arid Forest Research Institute
 Forest Research Institute (India)
 Himalayan Forest Research Institute
 Institute of Forest Biodiversity
 Institute of Forest Genetics and Tree Breeding
 Institute of Forest Productivity
 Institute of Wood Science and Technology
 Rain Forest Research Institute
 Tropical Forest Research Institute
 Advanced Research Centre for Bamboo and Rattan
 Centre for Forestry Research and Human Resource Development
 Centre for Social Forestry and Eco-Rehabilitation
 Centre for Forest Based Livelihood and Extension
 Indian Institute of Forest Management
 Indian Plywood Industries Training and Research Institute
 Wildlife Institute of India (WII)

Ministry of External Affair
 Foreign Service Institute
 Indian Council for Cultural Relations

Ministry of Finance

Departments
 Indian Revenue Service
 Department of Disinvestment
 Department of Economic Affairs
 Department of Revenue
 Central Board of Excise and Customs
 Central Economic Intelligence Bureau
 Directorate General of Central Excise Intelligence
 Directorate General of Economic Enforcement
 Directorate of Revenue Intelligence
 Central Bureau of Narcotics
 Government Opium and Alkaloid Factories
 Central Board of Direct Taxes
 Income Tax Air Intelligence Unit
 Chief Commissioner of Income Tax Central
 Investigation Division of the Central Board of Direct Taxes
 National Academy of Direct Taxes
 Central Bureau of Narcotics
 Directorate General of Income Tax Investigation(for economic exchange related offences)
 Directorate of Income Tax Intelligence and Criminal Investigation (for criminal economic offences)

Autonomous Agencies
 Customs Excise and Service Tax Appellate Tribunal (CESTAT)
 Income Tax Appellate Tribunal (ITAT)
 National Institute of Financial Management
 Reserve Bank of India
 Securities and Exchange Board of India
 Insurance Regulatory and Development Authority
 Pension Fund Regulatory and Development Authority
 Insolvency and Bankruptcy Board of India
 National Institute of Securities Markets (NISM)

Ministry of Food Processing Industries
 National Institute of Food Technology, Entrepreneurship and Management - Thanjavur
 National Institute of Food Technology Entrepreneurship and Management - Kundli

Ministry of Health and Family Welfare
 Food Safety and Standards Authority of India (FSSAI)

Department of Health
 National AIDS Control Organisation (NACO)
 Medical Council of India
 Indian Nursing Council (INC)
 Dental Council of India
 All India Institute of Speech and Hearing (AIISH), Mysore
 All India Institute of Physical Medicine and Rehabilitation (AIIPMR), Mumbai
 Hospital Services Consultancy Corporation Limited (HSCC)
 Pharmacy Council of India[PCI]

Department of Family Welfare
 National Institute of Health and Family Welfare (NIHFW), South Delhi
 International Institute for Population Sciences (IIPS), Mumbai
 Central Drug Research Institute (CDRI), Lucknow
 Indian Council of Medical Research (ICMR), New Delhi

Ministry of AYUSH
 Research
 Central Council for Research in Ayurveda and Siddha (CCRAS)
 Central Council for Research in Unani Medicine (CCRUM)
 Central Council for Research in Homoeopathy (CCRH)
 Central Council for Research in Yoga and Naturopathy (CCRYN)
 Professional councils
 Central Council of Homoeopathy (CCH)
 Central Council of Indian Medicine

Ministry of Heavy Industries
 Department of Heavy Industries
 Automotive Research Association of India (ARAI)
 Bharat Heavy Electricals
 Fluid Control Research Institute (FCRI)

Ministry of Home Affairs

Departments

Department of Internal Security
 Indian Police Service
 Sardar Vallabhbhai Patel National Police Academy
 Intelligence Bureau
 National Investigation Agency (NIA)
 Narcotics Control Bureau
 National Civil Defence College
 Central Reserve Police Force
 Central Industrial Security Force
 National Security Guard
 Assam Rifles
 Rashtriya Rifles
 National Crime Records Bureau
 Bureau of Police Research and Development
 Department of Criminal Intelligence
 National Institute of Criminology and Forensic Sciences
 North Eastern Council
 North Eastern Police Academy
 Office of the Registrar General and Census Commissioner, Census of India

Department of Official Language
 Central Translation Bureau
 Central Hindi Training Institute

Department of Jammu and Kashmir and Laddak Affairs

Department of Home

Department of States

Central Armed Police Forces and Paramilitary forces
 Border Security Force
 Indo-Tibetan Border Police
 Sashastra Seema Bal
 Assam Rifles
 Central Reserve Police Force
 Central Industrial Security Force
 National Security Guard
 Defence Security Corps

Bureaus
 Bureau of Immigration, India
 Central Bureau of Investigation (CBI)
 National Crime Investigation Bureau (Registered Under Govt. Of India)
 Narcotics Control Bureau (NCB)
 Bureau of Police Research and Development, Libraries Network
 National Crime Records Bureau (NCRB)

Autonomous Bodies, Boards & Corporations
 National Foundation for Communal Harmony (NFCH)
 Repatriates Co-operative Finance and Development Bank Limited

Boards / Academies / Institutions (Grant in Aid)
 Regional Institute of Correctional Administration (RICA)
 Central Recordkeeping Agency (CRA) for the New Pension System (NPS), NSDL
 Scheduled Tribes and Other Traditional Forest Dwellers
 Welfare and Rehabilitation Board (WARB), New Delhi
 Rehabilitation Plantations Limited (RPL)
 National Securities Depository Limited (NSDL)
 National Institute of Disaster Management (NIDM)
 Centre for Disaster Management, LBSNAA, Mussoorie
 Officers Training Academy
 National Industrial Security Academy (NISA), CISF, Hyderabad

Regulatory Authorities
 National Disaster Management Authority NDMA

Commissions/Committees/Missions
 Committee for Consultations on the Situation in Andhra Pradesh (CCSAP)
 Committee of Parliament on Official Language

Councils
 Inter-State Council

Ministry of Housing and Urban Affairs 
 Building Materials and Technology Promotion Council (BMTPC)
 Central Government Employees Welfare Housing Organisation (CGEWHO)
 Hindustan Prefab Limited (HPL) (Public Sector Undertaking)
 Housing and Urban Development Corporation (HUDCO) (Public Sector Undertaking)
 National Buildings Organisation (NBO)
 National Cooperative Housing Federation of India (NCHFI)
 Principal Account Office (PAO)

Ministry of Education 
 Department of School Education and Literacy
 Central Board of Secondary Education (CBSE)
 National Council of Educational Research and Training (NCERT)
 Central Tibetan School Administration (CTSA)
 Kendriya Vidyalaya Sangathan (KVS)
 National Council for Teacher Education
 National Foundation for Teachers' Welfare
 Navodaya Vidyalaya Samiti (NVS)
 National Open School Institute (NosI)
 Department Higher Education
Organisational structure:
The department is divided into eight bureaus, and most of the work of the department is handled through over 100 autonomous organisations under these bureaus.
 University and Higher Education; Minorities Education
 University Grants Commission (UGC)
 Education Research and Development Organisation (ERDO)
 Indian Council of Social Science Research (ICSSR)
 Indian Council of Historical Research (ICHR)
 Indian Council of Philosophical Research (ICPR)
 46 Central Universities as on 11.09.2015, list issued by University Grants Commission
 Technical Education
 All India Council of Technical Education (AICTE)
 Council of Architecture (COA)
 25 Indian Institutes of Information Technology (IIITs) (Allahabad, Gwalior, Jabalpur, Kancheepuram and Kurnool )
 3 School of Planning and Architecture (SPAs)
 23 Indian Institutes of Technology (IITs)
 7 Indian Institutes of Science Education and Research (IISERs)
 20 Indian Institutes of Management (IIMs)
 31 National Institutes of Technology (NITs)
 Indian Institute of Engineering Science and Technology, Shibpur (IIEST)
 North Eastern Regional Institute of Science and Technology (NERIST)
 National Institute of Industrial Engineering (NITIE)
 4 National Institutes of Technical Teachers' Training & Research (NITTTRs) (Bhopal, Chandigarh, Chennai and Kolkata)
 4 Regional Boards of Apprenticeship / Practical Training
 Administration and Languages
 Three Deemed Universities in the field of Sanskrit, viz.
 Rashtriya Sanskrit Sansthan (RSkS) in New Delhi,
 Shri Lal Bahadur Shastri Rashtriya Sanskrit Vidyapeeth (SLBSRSV) New Delhi,
 Rashtriya Sanskrit Vidyapeeth (RSV) Tirupati
 Kendriya Hindi Sansthan (KHS), Agra
 English and Foreign Language University (EFLU), Hyderabad
 National Council for Promotion of Urdu Language (NCPUL)
 National Council for Promotion of Sindhi Language (NCPSL)
 Three subordinate offices: Central Hindi Directorate (CHD), New Delhi; Commission for Scientific & Technological Terminology (CSTT), New Delhi; and Central Institute of Indian Languages (CIIL), Mysore
 Distance Education and Scholarships
 Indira Gandhi National Open University (IGNOU)
 UNESCO, International Cooperation, Book Promotion and Copyrights, Education Policy, Planning and Monitoring
 Integrated Finance Division.
 Statistics, Annual Plan and CMIS
 Administrative Reform, North Eastern Region, SC/ST/OBC
Others:
 National Institute of Educational Planning and Administration (NIEPA)
 National Book Trust (NBT)
 National Board of Accreditation (NBA)
 National Commission for Minority Educational Institutions (NCMEI)
 National Institute of Open Schooling (NIOS)
 District Institute of Education and Training

Ministry of Women and Child Development

Ministry of Youth Affairs and Sports

Department of Sports
 National Sports Federation
 Sports Authority of India (SAI)
 National Anti-Doping Agency (NADA)
 Nehru Yuva Kendra Sangathan (NYKS)
 Board of Control for Cricket in India (BCCI)
 Hockey India
 Amateur Kabaddi Federation of India
 Kho-Kho Federation of India
 Wrestling Federation of India (WFI)
 All India Boxing Association (AIBA)
 Indian Amateur Boxing Federation
 All India Chess Federation
 Tamil Nadu State Chess Association (TNSCA)
 Badminton Association of India
 Ball Badminton Federation of India
 Table Tennis Federation of India (TTFI)
 All India Tennis Association (AITA)
 All India Carrom Federation (AICF)
 Billiards & Snookers Federation of India
 All India Football Federation (AIFF)
 Volleyball Federation of India (VFI)
 Basketball Federation of India
 Amateur Baseball federation of India
 Bridge Federation of India
 Cycling Federation of India
 Equestrian Federation of India (EFI)
 Indian Body Builders Federation
 Indian Weightlifting Federation
 Indian Powerlifting Federation
 Judo Federation of India
 Wushu Association of India
 Netball Federation of India
 Jump Rope Federation of India (JRFI)
 National Rifle Association of India (NRAI)
 Swimming Federation of India
 Yachting Association of India
 Services Sports Control Board
 Indian Olympic Association (IOA)
 Paralympic Committee of India

Ministry of Information and Broadcasting
 Directorate of Advertising and Visual Publicity
 Directorate of Field Publicity
 Directorate of Film Festivals
 International Film Festival of India
 Prasar Bharati
 All India Radio (AIR)
 Doordarshan (DD)
 Central Board of Film Certification
 Children's Film Society
 Film and Television Institute of India
 Film Certification Appellate Tribunal
 Indian Institute of Mass Communication (IIMC)
 National Film Archive of India (NFAI)
 Office of the Registrar of Newspapers for India (RNI)
 Press Council of India
 Press Information Bureau (PIB)
 Satyajit Ray Film and Television Institute
 Films Division
 Photo Division
 Publications Division
 Research Reference and Training Division
 Song and Drama Division
 Broadcast Engineering Consultants India Limited (public sector undertaking)
 National Film Development Corporation (public sector undertaking)

Ministry of Labour and Employment
 Directorate General of Employment and Training (DGE&T)
 Women Training Directorate
 Directorate General, Factory Advice Service and Labour Institutes (DGFASLI)
 Directorate General of Mines Safety (DGMS)
 Labour Bureau (labour statistics)
 Employees State Insurance Corporation (ESIC)
 Employees' Provident Fund Organisation
 Advanced Training Institute for Electronics and Process Instrumentation
 Advanced Training Institute, Mumbai
 Apprenticeship Training Scheme
 Craftsmen Training Scheme, Industrial training institute
 Foreman Training Institute, Bangalore
 V. V. Giri National Labour Institute
 central board for workers education *

Ministry of Law and Justice
 Department of Justice
 Department of Legal Affairs
 Law Commission of India
 Appellate Tribunal for Foreign Exchange
 Customs Excise and Service tax Appellate Tribunal (CESTAT)
 Income Tax Appellate Tribunal (ITAT)
 Legislative Department
 First National Judicial Pay Commission

Ministry of Micro, Small and Medium Enterprises
 Office of the Development Commissioner (MSME)
 Khadi & Village Industries Commission
 Coir Board
 National Small Industries Corporation
 National Institute of Micro, Small and Medium Enterprises (formerly the National Institute of Small Industry Extension Training)
 Indian Institute of Entrepreneurship

Ministry of Mines
 Geological Survey of India (GSI)
 Indian Bureau of Mines
 National Institute of Rock Mechanics (NIRM)
 Jawaharlal Nehru Aluminium Research Development and Design Centre (JNARDDC)
 Hindustan Copper Limited (HCL)
 Mineral Exploration Corporation Limited (MECL)
 National Aluminium Company Limited (NALCO)

Ministry of Minority Affairs
 Maulana Azad Education Foundation
 National Minorities Development and Finance Corporation (NMDFC)
 Central Wakf Council
 National Commission for Minorities (NCM)
 National Commissioner for Linguistic Minorities

Ministry of New and Renewable Energy
Autonomous R&D Institution under MNRE
 Centre for Wind Energy Technology, (CWET) Chennai
 National Institute of Solar Energy (NISE), Gurgaon
PSUs / Joint Ventures
 Indian Renewable Energy Development Agency Limited (IREDA)

Ministry of Personnel, Public Grievances and Pensions

Department of Personnel and Training
 Civil Services Officers Institute (CSOI)
 Lal Bahadur Shastri National Academy of Administration (LBSNAA)
 Institute of Secretariat Training and Management (ISTM)
 Union Public Service Commission (UPSC)
 Staff Selection Commission (SSC)
 Public Enterprises Selection Board (PESB)
 Central Government Employees Consumer Cooperative Society Ltd. (Kendriya Bhandar)
 Central Bureau of Investigation. (CBI)

Department of Administrative Reforms and Public Grievances

Ministry of Petroleum and Natural Gas
 Directorate General of Hydrocarbons
  Centre for High Technology
  Oil Industry Development Board
  Oil Industry Safety Directorate
  Petroleum Conservation Research Association
  Petroleum Planning and Analysis Cell
  Petroleum federation of India (Petrofed)

Ministry of Power

Bureaus
 Bureau of Energy Efficiency (BEE)

Autonomous bodies, boards and corporations
 Central Power Research Institute (CPRI), Bangalore, Karnataka
 National Power Training Institute (NPTI), Faridabad, Haryana

Statutory Bodies
 Damodar Valley Corporation (DVC)
 Bhakra Beas Management Board (BBMB)
 Central Electricity Authority (CEA)
 Central Electricity Regulatory Commission (CERC)
 Regional Inspectorial Organisation, Shillong

Commissions, committees and missions
 Northern Regional Power Committee, Ministry of Power
 Southern Regional Power Committee
 Western Regional Power Committee (WRPC)

Ministry of Railways
 Railway Board
 Indian Railways
 16 Zones
 Research Design and Standards Organisation, Lucknow
 Indian Railway Catering and Tourism Corporation (public sector undertaking)
 Konkan Railway Corporation (public sector undertaking)
 Mumbai Railway Vikas Corporation (public sector undertaking)
 Production Units
 Banaras Locomotive Works
 Chittaranjan Locomotive Works
 Patiala Locomotive Works
 Integral Coach Factory
 Rail Coach Factory
 Rail Wheel Factory
 Maintenance Units
 Bharat Wagon and Engineering Limited (public sector undertaking)
 Central Organisation for Modernisation of Workshops
  Centre For Railway Information Systems(CRIS)
 Central Organisation for Railway Electrification (CORE)
 Container Corporation of India (public sector undertaking)
 Dedicated Freight Corridor Corporation of India (public sector undertaking)
 Indian Railway Finance Corporation (public sector undertaking)
 Ircon International (public sector undertaking)
 Rail Vikas Nigam (public sector undertaking)
 Railtel Corporation of India (public sector undertaking)
 Railway Protection Force
 RITES Limited (public sector undertaking)
 Rail Land Development Authority

Ministry of Road Transport and Highways

Agencies 
 National Highway Authority of India (NHAI)
 Indian Academy of Highway Engineers (IAHE)
 National Highways and Infrastructure Development Corporation Limited (NHIDCL)

Ministry of Rural Development
 National Institute of Rural Development (NIRD)
 Department of Land Resources
 Department of Rural Development
 Department of Drinking Water Supply

Ministry of Science & Technology

Department of Biotechnology

Department of Ocean Development
 National Centre for Antarctic and Ocean Research (NCAOR)

Department of Scientific & Industrial Research
 Council of Scientific and Industrial Research
 National Research Development CorporationNational Research Development Corporation
 Consultancy Development Centre
 Central Electronics Limited

Department of Science & Technology
 Agharkar Research Institute, Pune*
 Aryabhatta Research Institute of Observational-Sciences, Nanital*
 Bose Institute, Kolkata*
 Birbal Sahni Institute of Palaeobotany, Lucknow*
 Centre for Nano and Soft Matter Sciences, Bangalore*
 Indian Association for the Cultivation of Science, Kolkata*
 Institute of Nano Science and Technology, Mohali*
 Indian Institute of Astrophysics, Bangalore*
 Indian Institute of Geomagnetism, Mumbai*
 International Advanced Research Centre for Powder Metallurgy and New Materials, Hyderabad*
 Jawaharlal Nehru Centre for Advanced Scientific Research, Bangalore*
 National Innovation Foundation*
 Raman Research Institute, Bangalore*
 Sree Chitra Tirunal Institute for Medical Sciences and Technology*
 S.N. Bose National Centre for Basic Sciences, Kolkata*
 The Institute of Advanced Study in Science & Technology, Guwahati*
 Technology Information, Forecasting and Assessment Council (TIFAC)*
 North East Centre for Technology Application and Reach (NECTAR), Shillong, Meghalaya*
 Vigyan Prasar, New Delhi*
 Wadia Institute of Himalayan Geology, Dehradun*

Ministry of Social Justice and Empowerment
 Commissions
 National Commission for Backward Classes
 National Commission for Scheduled Castes
 National Commission for Safai Karamcharis
 Other Statutory Bodies
 Rehabilitation Council of India
 Chief Commissioner for Persons with Disabilities
 National Trust for the Welfare of Persons with Autism, Cerebral Palsy, Mental Retardation
 National Institutes
 Ali Yavar Jung National Institute for the Hearing Handicapped
 Pt. Deendayal Upadhyaya Institute for the Physically Handicapped
 National Institute of Mentally Handicapped
 Swami Vivekananda National Institute of Rehabilitation Training and Research

Ministry of Statistics and Programme Implementation

Departments
 Department of Statistics
 Department of Programme Implementation

Autonomous Bodies
 Central Statistical Office (CSO)
 National Sample Survey Office (NSSO)
 Indian Statistical Institute (ISI)

Ministry of Skill Development and Entrepreneurship
 National Institute of Entrepreneurship and Small Business Development (NIESBUD)
 National Skill Development Corporation (NSDC)
 Indian Institute of Entrepreneurship (IIE), Guwahati
 National council of vocational education and training (NCVET)
 National skill development agency (NSDA)

Ministry of Steel
 Steel Authority of India (SAIL)
 Rashtriya Ispat Nigam Limited (RINL)
 National Mineral Development Corporation (NMDC)

Ministry of Textiles

Autonomous Bodies
 National Institute of Fashion Technology (NIFT)
 Sardar Vallabhbhai Patel Institute of Textile Management

Statutory Bodies
 Textiles Committee
 Central Silk Board, Bangalore

Export Promotion Councils
 EEPC India (Formerly, Engineering Export Promotion Council), largest export promotion council in India.
 Apparel Export Promotion Council (AEPC)
 Carpet Export Promotion Council (CEPC)
 Cotton Textile Export Promotion Council (TEXPROCIL)
 Export Promotion Council for Handicrafts (EPCH)
 Handloom Export Promotion Council (HEPC)
 Gem and Jewellery Export Promotion Council (GJEPC)
 Cashew Export Promotion Council of India (CEPC)
 Pharmaceutical Export Promotion Council (Pharmexcil)

Textiles Research Associations
 Northern India Textile Research Association (NITRA)
 Ahmedabad Textile Industry's Research Association (ATIRA)
 Bombay Textile Research Association (BTRA)
 South India Textile Research Association (SITRA)
 Jute Industry's Research Association (IJIRA)
 Wool Research Association (WRA)
 The Synthetic & Art Silk Mills Research Association (SASMIRA)
 Man-made Textile Research Association (MANTRA)

Public Sector Undertakings
 British India Corporation Ltd. (BIC)
 Central Cottage Industries Corporation (CCIC)
 Cotton Corporation of India Ltd. (CCI)
 Handicrafts and Handlooms Export Corporation (HHEC)
 Jute Corporation of India Ltd. (JCI)
 National Handloom Development Corporation (NHDC)
 National Jute Manufacturers Corporation (NJMC)
 Birds Jute and Export Ltd. (BJEL)
 National Textile Corporation Ltd. (NTC)

Independent Departments

Department of Atomic Energy

Apex Board
 Atomic Energy Commission (AEC), Mumbai, Maharashtra

Regulatory Board and Organisation
 Atomic Energy Regulatory Board (AERB), Mumbai, Maharashtra is given some regulation powers by AEC.

Research & Development Sector 
 Bhabha Atomic Research Centre (BARC), Mumbai, following Research institutions affiliated to BARC
 Atomic Minerals Directorate for Exploration and Research (AMD), Hyderabad
 Indira Gandhi Centre for Atomic Research (IGCAR), Kalpakkam, Tamil Nadu
 Raja Ramanna Centre for Advanced Technology (RRCAT), Indore
 Variable Energy Cyclotron Centre (VECC), Kolkata
 Global Centre for Nuclear Energy Partnership

Central Public Sector Units
 Electronics Corporation of India (ECIL), Hyderabad
 Indian Rare Earths Limited (IREL), Mumbai
 Uranium Corporation of India, Singhbhum
 Nuclear Power Corporation of India (NPCIL), Mumbai, Maharashtra
 Bharatiya Nabhkiya Vidyut Nigam Limited (BHAVINI), Kalpakkam, Tamil Nadu

Industrial Organisations
 Heavy Water Board (HWB), Mumbai
 Nuclear Fuel Complex (NFC), Hyderabad
 Board of Radiation & Isotope Technology (BRIT), Mumbai

Service Organisations
 Directorate of Construction, Services and Estate Management (DAE) (DCSEM), Mumbai
 Directorate of Purchase and Stores (DAE) (DPS), Mumbai
 General Services Organisation (DAE) (GSO), Kalpakkam

Universities
 Homi Bhabha National Institute, Mumbai
 Tata Institute of Fundamental Research, Mumbai
 Tata Institute of Fundamental Research, Hyderabad

Aided Sector 
 National Institute of Science Education and Research, Bhubaneswar
 National Board for Higher Mathematics (NBHM), New Delhi
 Atomic Energy Education Society (AEES), Mumbai
 Tata Memorial Centre, Mumbai
 Centre for Excellence in Basic Sciences
 Saha Institute of Nuclear Physics (SINP), Kolkata
 Institute of Physics, Bhubaneswar
 Harish-Chandra Research Institute (HRI), Allahabad
 Institute of Mathematical Sciences (IMSc), Chennai
 Institute for Plasma Research, Gandhinagar

Department of Space
The Department of Space manages the following agencies and institutes:
 Indian Space Research Organisation (ISRO) – The primary research and development arm of the DoS.
 Vikram Sarabhai Space Centre (VSSC), Thiruvananthapuram.
 Liquid Propulsion Systems Centre (LPSC), Thiruvananthapuram.
 Satish Dhawan Space Centre (SDSC-SHAR), Sriharikota.
 ISRO Satellite Centre (ISAC), Bangalore.
 Space Applications Centre (SAC), Ahmedabad.
 National Remote Sensing Centre (NRSC), Hyderabad.
 ISRO Inertial Systems Unit (IISU), Thiruvananthapuram.
 Development and Educational Communication Unit (DECU), Ahmedabad.
 Master Control Facility (MCF), Hassan.
 ISRO Telemetry, Tracking and Command Network (ISTRAC), Bangalore.
 Laboratory for Electro-Optics Systems (LEOS), Bangalore.
 Indian Institute of Remote Sensing (IIRS), Dehradun.
 Antrix Corporation – The marketing arm of ISRO.
 Physical Research Laboratory (PRL), Ahmedabad.
 National Atmospheric Research Laboratory (NARL), Gadanki.
 North-Eastern Space Applications Centre (NE-SAC), Umiam.
 Semi-Conductor Laboratory (SCL), Mohali.
 Indian Institute of Space Science and Technology (IIST), Thiruvananthapuram – India's space university.
 New Space India Limited (NSIL), Bangalore.
 Indian National Space Promotion and Authorisation Centre (IN–SPACe)

Independent Agencies/Bodies
 Election Commission of India
 Comptroller and Auditor General of India (CAG)
 Reserve Bank of India (RBI)
 Union Public Service Commission (UPSC)
 Central Information Commission
 Central Vigilance Commission (CVC)
 National Human Rights Commission (NHRC)
 National Commission for Backward Classes (NCBC)
 National Commission for Scheduled Castes (NCSC)
 National Commission for Scheduled Tribes (NCST)
 National Commission for Women (NCW)
  National Commission for Protection of Child Rights(NCPCR)
 National Commission for Minorities (NCM)
 National Commission on Population
 Securities Exchange Board of India (SEBI)
 Goods & Services Tax Council (GSTC)
 Telecom Regulatory Authority of India(TRAI)

Intelligence

National
 Research and Analysis Wing (RAW) (external)
 Intelligence Bureau (IB) (internal)
 National Investigation Agency(Internal)
 Department of Criminal Intelligence (Internal/Criminal Investigation)
 
 Central Bureau Of Investigation (CBI)(Internal/Criminal Investigation)
 Narcotics Control Bureau(NCB) (Internal/Criminal Investigation)

Economic
 Economic Intelligence Council
 Central Economic Intelligence Bureau
 Directorate of Enforcement (ED)
 Central Bureau of Narcotics (CBN)
 Directorate General of Income Tax Investigation
 Financial Intelligence Unit (FIU)
 Directorate of Income Tax Intelligence and Criminal Investigation
 Directorate General of Anti-Evasion
 Directorate General of GST Intelligence
 Directorate General of Revenue Intelligence(DGRI)

Military
 Directorate of Military Intelligence
 Directorate of Air Intelligence
 Directorate of Naval Intelligence
 Defense Intelligence Agency

Other
 All-India Radio Monitoring Service (AIRMS)
 Joint Cipher Bureau

Tribunals in India

 Central Administrative Tribunal
 Armed Forces Tribunal
 Appellate Tribunal for Foreign Exchange
 Airports Economic Regulatory Authority
Appellate Tribunal
 Appellate Tribunal for Forfeited Property
 Income-Tax Appellate Tribunal
 Customs, Excise and Service Tax Appellate Tribunal
 Authority for Advance Rulings (Central Excise, Customs and Service Tax)
 Competition Commission of India
 Competition Appellate Tribunal
 Company Law Board
 Appellate Tribunal for Electricity
 National Highways Tribunal
 Railway Claims Tribunal
 Debts Recovery Appellate Tribunal
 Industrial Tribunal
 Intellectual Property Appellate Board
 Securities Appellate Tribunal
 Telecom Regulatory Authority of India
 Telecom Disputes Settlement and Appellate Authority
 Cyber Appellate Tribunal
 Film Certification Appellate Tribunal
 National Green Tribunal
 National Consumer Disputes Redressal Commission

See also

 Union Government ministries of India
 List of think tanks in India
 List of institutes funded by the Central Government of India
 List of Indian Intelligence agencies

References
13. https://www.sctimst.ac.in/